Banca may refer to:

Places
 Bangka Island, an island lying east of Sumatra, part of Indonesia
 Banca, Pyrénées-Atlantiques, a commune of the Pyrénées-Atlantiques département, France
 Banca, Tasmania, a locality in Tasmania, Australia
 Banca, Vaslui, a commune in Vaslui County, Romania
 Banca, a village in Dealu Morii Commune, Bacău County, Romania

Other
 Banca or Bangka (boat), a Philippine outrigger canoe